Milagros "Millie" Aviles (alternatively known as Milly Aviles; born November 20, 1964, in Santurce, Puerto Rico) is a Puerto Rican actress and singer. She is better known as a telenovela actress from the golden era of telenovelas in Puerto Rico, which spanned from the late 1950s to the early 1990s. Aviles was the main female lead star, acting alongside male lead star Braulio Castillo, hijo, in three telenovelas, named "Alejandra" in 1987, "Andrea" in 1988 and "Pacto de Amor" in 1989. She also acted in 1984's "Diana Carolina".

Singing career 
Aviles had a single, named "Yo no se Porque" ("I Don't Know Why"), which was the theme song of her soap opera, "Pacto de Amor".

Personal 
Aviles' sister is actress Maricarmen Aviles. Millie Aviles was once romantically linked to musical producer Edgardo Diaz, director of boy band Menudo. Aviles lives in the United States.

In popular culture 
Aviles is played by Amanda Rivera Torres in the Amazon Prime Video miniseries based on the success of Menudo, "Subete a mi moto".

See also 
List of Puerto Ricans

External links 

1964 births
Living people
People from San Juan, Puerto Rico
Puerto Rican actresses
20th-century Puerto Rican women singers
Actresses from Miami
Hispanic and Latino American actresses